Rebala is a village located in the Buchireddypalem mandal of Nellore district, Andhra Pradesh, India.

References

Villages in Nellore district